Good Vibes is an American adult animated sitcom created by David Gordon Green and Brad Ableson and Mike Clements for MTV. The series follows the exploits of recent New Jersey transplant Mondo and his new best friend Woodie as they live their life in Playa Del Toro, a fictional Southern California beach town. The show was originally sold to Fox in 2008, and a pilot produced. When Fox passed, the producers looked for other buyers and in 2010 they received a series order at MTV.

On February 24, 2012, the series was cancelled after one season.

Characters
 Montgomery "Mondo" Brando (Josh Gad): Mondo is a young overweight teenage boy from Bayonne, New Jersey who is rather self-conscious and insecure about his looks. At first he kept to himself but after befriending Woodie, he begins to break out of his shell. He starts taking up surfing and develops a crush on Jeena who finally became his girlfriend. Mondo has never met his father; in "Mondo Mia!" we learn that his father was a "cleanup man" for the Mob who had to go on the run after witnessing something he shouldn't (two mobsters making out). He is Jeena's boyfriend.
 Woodford "Woodie" Stone (Adam Brody): Woodie is Mondo's best friend. As opposed to Mondo who is short and fat, Woodie is tall and skinny. Woodie is a lazy, laid-back and hedonistic surfer. He hates doing any type of work and prefers to spend all of his days surfing. Woodie's family is incredibly rich, but he hates what material wealth has done to them and prefers to sleep in a bamboo hut outside the mansion.
 Barbara "Babs" Brando (Debi Mazar): Babs is Mondo's mother, she has worked several jobs: her current job is waitressing at a Hawaiian restaurant. She is very attractive and has large breasts and is the object of Woodie's (and every other man's) desire. A running gag in the pilot was that she longed for a job where she didn't have to work a pole, be on her back, be on her knees, and so on, and then several jobs where she did these things were seen: fireman-pole cleaner, meter maid, factory worker, mechanic, etc.
 Winthrop Aguilera Wadska (Tony Hale): Commonly referred to by his last name, Wadska is hyperactive, overly paranoid and somewhat psychotic. Wadska is known to engage in harmful and dangerous behavior and often gets Woodie and Mondo involved in some way. According to his sister Jeena he is on medication, possibly the reason behind his behavior. He also uses the Internet to prepare for both the apocalypse and college, whatever comes first to him. In every episode, his shirt has a different saying on it; similar to Frank's hats on 30 Rock.
 Jeena Wadska (Olivia Thirlby): Jeena is a popular and attractive girl who is Mondo's crush after having a vision about their graduation, marriage, life, afterlife in Episode 1. She is a bit of a tomboy and is very nice and laid-back. She also likes Mondo but she has an on-and-off relationship with Turk; in "Red Tuxedo" she breaks up with Turk and begins dating Mondo. She is Wadska's sister and Mondo's girlfriend.
 Dirk Kirk "Turk" Turkpatrick (Jake Busey): Turk is the resident tough guy. He is shown as a brash and unrefined bully often targets Mondo. However he has a very sensitive side and shown to be rather cowardly deep down. He used to date Milan and now has an on-and-off relationship with Jeena who later breaks up with him and starts dating Mondo.
 Milan Stone (Kari Wahlgren): Milan is Woodie's sister. She is a mean, vapid, vain, pretentious, snobbish, selfish, promiscuous and spoiled celebrity heiress who stars in her own reality show on MTV titled "16 and Bitchy". She has breast implants (which are removable by zipper) and used to date Turk. Despite her spoiled and snobbish demeanor, it is revealed that prior to her family's wealthy lifestyle, she and her brother always played together at the beach when they were young kids and that she still secretly cherishes that.
 Voneeta Teets (Danny McBride): The sex-ed teacher at Del Toro High. She is a bisexual who weighs 400 pounds and gets around in a motorized scooter, but she is immensely proud of her body and is insatiably horny.
 Lonnie (Alan Tudyk): A hippie and Gulf War vet who lives in a van by the beach. He gives Mondo and Woodie advice, usually while stoned.
 HJ & BJ Kuntz (Cree Summer): Identical twins who are Milan's friends/entourage.

Episodes

Reception

Good Vibes received mixed reviews from critics. Some, like San Francisco Chronicle'''s David Wiegand found its writing to be "juvenile, hormonal and often pretty dang funny", while Pittsburgh Post-Gazette's Rob Owen branded it "aggressively dumb, sex-obsessed and occasionally misogynistic". In its review of the first season, Emily VanDerWerff of The A.V. Club'' criticized the pilot, praised later episodes and expressed optimism towards the series' future, mentioning that "this isn’t a recommendation exactly—there are still a few too many problems with the surface level of the show—but the undercarriage is sound, and it wouldn’t be surprising if this developed into a surprisingly sweet and winning little show given enough time".

The show achieved a metascore of 58 on Metacritic and a Rotten Tomatoes score of 70%, with an average rating of 6.15/10. It was cancelled by MTV on February 24, 2012 due to low ratings.

References

External links
 

2011 American television series debuts
2011 American television series endings
2010s American adult animated television series
2010s American high school television series
2010s American sitcoms
American adult animated comedy television series
American animated sitcoms
American flash adult animated television series
English-language television shows
MTV cartoons
Teenage pregnancy in television
Teen animated television series
Television shows set in Los Angeles
Television series by Warner Horizon Television